God Is a DJ may refer to:

 "God Is a DJ" (Faithless song), 1998
 "God Is a DJ" (Pink song), 2004